The Ayaneo 2 is a handheld gaming computer developed by Ayaneo and released in December 2022. The console uses a Zen 3 processor. It can play PC games on the Windows 11 operating system. It compete against Valve's Steam Deck. 

There is also an Ayaneo Geek version, which was launched together with Ayaneo 2. Differently than Ayaneo 2, Ayaneo Geek will not have motion sensors in both the body and handles, a higher-quality vibration motor, touch-to-wake support for the fingerprint sensor, and a PCIe 4.0 SSD by default. It will start at $949.

References 

2022 in video gaming
Computer-related introductions in 2022
Handheld personal computers
Products introduced in 2022